Maryory Estefanny Cristina Sánchez Panibra (born 7 April 1997) is a Peruvian footballer who plays as a goalkeeper for Colombian club Millonarios F.C. and the Peru women's national team.

Club career
In April 2021, Sánchez signed with Ecuadorian team Academia Sport JC.

In January 2022, Sánchez joined Colombian team Millonarios F.C. on loan from Club Alianza Lima.

International career
Sánchez represented Peru at the 2013 South American U-17 Women's Championship and two South American U-20 Women's Championship editions (2014 and 2015). At senior level, she played two Copa América Femenina editions (2014 and 2018) and the 2019 Pan American Games.

References

External links

1997 births
Living people
Women's association football goalkeepers
Peruvian women's footballers
Footballers from Lima
Peru women's international footballers
Pan American Games competitors for Peru
Footballers at the 2019 Pan American Games
Club Universitario de Deportes footballers
Sporting Cristal footballers
21st-century Peruvian women